The Battle of Vyborg Bay was fought in the Finnish-Soviet Continuation War (1941–1944).

Background
The Soviet offensive against the Finns started on June 10 and managed to break through the Finnish defensive lines at Valkeasaari and Kuuterselkä on June 15. This forced the Finnish forces on the Karelian Isthmus to withdraw to the still incomplete Finnish VKT-line. Although Soviet advance forces captured Viborg on June 20, the main offensive got stuck in the stubborn Finnish defense of the Tali-Ihantala region. Despite heavy fighting and use of fresh reserves, the VKT-line bent but did not break, forcing the Leningrad Front to seek alternate routes past the Finnish defenses. The Leningrad Front followed roughly the same plan as in the Winter War and made plans for a crossing of Viborg Bay.

Order of battle

Soviet
Soviet forces that took part in the battle were part of the Leningrad Front under Leonid Govorov's command. The attack across the Bay of Viborg was assigned to the 59th Army (Ivan Korovnikov) to which the 43rd Rifle Corps (Andreyev) was subordinated. Infantry forces involved in the offensive were the 124th and 224th Rifle Divisions with the 80th Rifle Division being kept in reserve. Only a few Soviet tanks were assigned to support the offensive. Several artillery regiments were assigned to the offensive, it also had air support from the Baltic Fleet and light naval forces of the Soviet Baltic Fleet as well as the 260th Naval Infantry Regiment also supported the offensive.

Finnish
Initially the forces responsible for the defense were the 22nd Coastal Artillery Regiment (RTR 22) of the Eastern Bay of Finland Coastal Brigade (Enkainen), under the command of the Commander of the Finnish Navy, and parts of the Cavalry Brigade (Tähtinen) under the Finnish V Corps (V AK). Both the 22nd Coastal Artillery Regiment and the newly arrived German 122nd Infantry Division (Breusing) were subsequently subordinated to the Finnish V Corps. A large portion of the Finnish Navy supported the defensive operations.

Battle
Initially the Vyborg Bay islands were in a fairly strong position with the Finnish garrison on the Koivisto islands preventing Soviet naval forces from gaining access to the bay. The Soviet Baltic Fleet landed a small assault force on the islands, but the Finnish garrison managed to keep the bridgehead contained. Nevertheless, Finnish headquarters decided it would be impossible to keep the troops in the islands supplied given Soviet air supremacy, and withdrew their forces from the islands unopposed. This opened the route for the Baltic Fleet to get safely into the bay.

Battles in Vyborg Bay started on June 30 with the Soviet 224th Rifle Division's attempt to capture the islands of Teikari and Melansaari. Finnish forces on the islands drove the attacks back, inflicting heavy losses on the Soviet troops in the process. Renewed Soviet attacks on July 4 met success in the islands near Uuras, but the attempt to land on Teikari was again repulsed with heavy Soviet losses.

On July 4 and 5 the Finnish Navy, supported by several German AFP gunbarges, made several raids on Viborg Bay in an attempt to disrupt the Soviet landings on the islands. Heavy Soviet resistance from shore artillery, numerous Motor Torpedo Boats, (MTB)s, and the Soviet air force forced the Finns to withdraw without reaching the intended target area. Although none of the Finnish ships were sunk, most of them suffered casualties among their crews and were badly damaged, requiring immediate repairs. This situation effectively forced Finnish naval forces to withdraw from the battle. Of the Finnish ships, the worst damage was suffered by the auxiliary gunboat Viena during a Soviet air attack on its anchorage. The ship came close to sinking but was still able to return to Helsinki for repairs.

Parts of the Soviet 124th Rifle Division captured the islands of Teikari and Melansaari on July 5–6. Fighting on the other islands closer to the northern shore continued until July 8 when the Soviet 124th and 224th Rifle Divisions attempted landings on the northern shore of the bay. The defending German 122nd Division repulsed the attempts. The Soviet 59th Army switched to defense after these attempts, and fighting in the bay wound down.

Aftermath
In costly battles the 124th and 224th Rifle Divisions of the Soviet 59th Army managed to capture the islands dominating Vyborg Bay, but failed to gain a bridgehead on the northern shore of the bay. With both the initial attempt at Tali-Ihantala and the crossing at Vyborg Bay blocked, the Leningrad Front turned its attention to the still undecided battles raging in the Äyräpää-Vuosalmi region.

References

Bibliography

 
 

Battles and operations of the Continuation War
1944 in Finland
Naval battles of World War II involving Finland
Naval battles of World War II involving Germany
Naval battles of World War II involving the Soviet Union
History of Vyborg
June 1944 events
July 1944 events
Karelo-Finnish Soviet Socialist Republic